The 2001–02 Kentucky Wildcats men's basketball team represented University of Kentucky in the 2001–02 NCAA Division I men's basketball season. The head coach was Tubby Smith and the team finished the season with an overall record of 22–10.

Previous season
The Wildcats  finished the 2000–01 season 24–10, 12–4 in SEC play to finish first in the SEC East. In the SEC tournament, the Wildcats defeated South Carolina Gamecocks men's basketball in the quarterfinals, Arkansas in the semifinals, and Ole Miss in the SEC Championship Game.. As a result, the Wildcats received the conference's automatic bid to the NCAA tournament. As the No. 2 seed in the East region, they defeated No. 15 Holy Cross and No. 7 Iowa to advance to the Sweet Sixteen. There, they lost to No. 6-seeded USC.

Departures

Roster

Schedule and results

|-
!colspan=12 style=| Exhibition

|-
!colspan=12 style=| Regular Season

|-
!colspan=12 style=| SEC Tournament

|-
!colspan=12 style=| NCAA Tournament

References 

Kentucky Wildcats men's basketball seasons
Kentucky
Kentucky
Wild
Wild